The Northern Alberta Institute of Technology (NAIT) is a polytechnic and applied sciences institute in Edmonton, Alberta, Canada. NAIT provides careers programs in applied research, technical training, applied education, and learning designed to meet the demands of Alberta's technical and knowledge-based industries. NAIT offers approximately 120 credit programs leading to degrees, applied degrees, diplomas, and certificates. As of 2018, there are approximately 16,000 students in credit programs, 12,000 apprentices registered in apprenticeship training, 14,500 students enrolled in non-credit courses, and more than 20,000 registrants for customized corporate based training. NAIT also attracts international students from 94 countries. NAIT is similar to an Institute of technology or university of applied sciences as termed in other jurisdictions.  The campus newspaper, the NAIT Nugget, is a member of the Canadian University Press (CUP).

Programs
The polytechnic confers certificates, diplomas, applied degrees and baccalaureate degrees. NAIT's four-year baccalaureate degrees (Bachelor of Technology in Technology Management and Bachelor of Technology in Construction Management and Bachelor of Business Administration) were launched in 2007.

NAIT is one of the largest apprenticeship trainers in Canada offering 31 registered trades programs.

History
In 1959, the Alberta provincial government decided to build an Edmonton facility to supplement apprenticeship and vocational training, which was at the time handled by the Provincial Institute of Technology (PITA) in Calgary. The new institution would be named the Northern Alberta Institute of Technology (NAIT) and PITA would be renamed the Southern Alberta Institute of Technology (SAIT). Construction of the new facility began in January 1962. The first class was enrolled in October, a group of 29 Communication Electrician apprentices. NAIT officially opened on May 27, 1963, with a ceremony led by Premier Ernest Manning. The first graduation ceremony happened in 1965, with a class of 326 graduates. In 1982, the government transferred control to the new Board of Governors, chaired by Allan McCagherty. NAIT has been a leading polytechnic for more than 50 years. The school marked its 50th anniversary in 2012.

Campus

The institute has four campuses located in Edmonton and Spruce Grove:
 Main campus at 11762 - 106 Street, Edmonton
 Patricia campus at 12204 - 149 Street, Edmonton
 Souch campus at 7110 Gateway Boulevard, Edmonton
 Spruce Grove campus at 281 Tamarack Drive, Spruce Grove.

In February 2019, the Main campus acquired 13.27 hectares of the former Edmonton City Centre Airport with the option for another 3.23 hectares, as well as the 4.8 hectare Westwood Transit Garage to the north. This will enable the closure of the Patricia and Souch campuses, and the construction of a student residence building. The Spruce Grove campus will remain open since its crane and hoisting classes cannot be accommodated at the Main campus.

Mascot
NAIT's mascot is the Ook. This is a shortened version of the Inuktitut word for the snowy owl, ookpik. NAIT was presented this mascot in 1964 by the federal Department of Northern Affairs and National Resources, now Indigenous and Northern Affairs Canada. Most of NAIT's sports teams are now called the Ooks as well.

Athletics
The NAIT Ooks compete in the Alberta Colleges Athletic Conference. Ooks team sports include badminton, basketball, ice hockey, soccer, curling, and volleyball. NAIT's official colours are blue and yellow.

Students' Association

The NAIT Students' Association (NAITSA) is composed entirely of current NAIT students. It is led by a four-person elected Executive Council, and governed by an eighteen-person elected Senate (two representatives from the 9 program groups). NAITSA is responsible for running the Nest Taphouse Grill, The NAIT Nugget (campus newspaper), campus events, the student health and dental plan, U-Pass and various other services aimed at enhancing student life.

Techlifetoday magazine
Techlifetoday is the polytechnic's official magazine, focusing on people, technology and innovation. It launched in 2007 as techlife, a print magazine, which later expanded to techlifetoday.ca in 2016. Techlifetoday has published exclusively online since November 2018 and has earned numerous industry awards.

Organization 
NAIT is organized into four academic schools and one academic department:
 JR Shaw School of Business
 School of Health and Life Sciences
 School of Applied Sciences and Technology
 School of Skilled Trades (which includes the Department of Culinary Arts and Professional Food Studies)
 Department of Continuing Education

Notable alumni 
 Robert Barefoot, (Chemical Research Technology), chemist, author, lecturer
 Gil Cardinal, filmmaker
 Nolan Crouse, (Chemical Technology, Master of Business Administration), Former Mayor, City of St. Albert, 2007–2017
 Patrick LaForge (Marketing '74), Edmonton Oilers Past President and CEO
 Jarred Land, Red Digital Cinema Camera Company President
 Kevin Martin, Winter Olympic gold medalist curler
 Ian McClelland (Photographic Technology '65), founder, Colorfast Corporation, former MP for Edmonton Southwest and former MLA for Edmonton Rutherford
 Bryan Mudryk, TSN SportsCentre anchor
 Doug Pruden (Architectural Technology '82), push up World Record holder holds 9 records
 Vince Steen, Northwest Territories MLA
 Corbin Tomaszeski (Culinary Arts '92), chef on Food Network's Restaurant Makeover
 Bruce Woloshyn, (Radio and Television Arts '84), Visual Effects Supervisor
 Percy Wickman (Finance '69), former Edmonton alderman, and former MLA of Edmonton-Whitemud
 Olivia Cheng (Radio and Television Arts), Canadian Actress
 Dave Quest (Business Administration '85), Politician, Strathcona-Sherwood Park MLA
 William (Billy) Morin, Indigenous leader, Enoch Cree Nation Chief, 
 Morris Panych (Radio and Television Arts), Canadian Actor and Director
 Cathy King (Radio and Television Arts), Gold Medalist curler
 Dave Pettitt (Broadcasting), Canadian Actor and Voice-over Artist
 Barb Higgins (Business Administration and Radio and Television Arts), Television News Anchor and Journalist
 Natasha Staniszewski (Radio and Television Arts '55), Sports Reporter and Anchor
 Travis Toews (Unknown), Canadian Politician, Accountant, Rancher, Business Owner, Minister of Finance of Alberta and President of the Treasury Board.
 Bob McLeod (Administrative Management), Politician, Northwest Territories MLA and 12th Premier of the Northwest Territories
 Richard Newman (Radio and Television Arts), Broadcaster and Writer
 Bol Kong (Radio and Television Arts), Professional Basketball Player with National Basketball League of Canada (NBL) and NBA Draft. Named All-Canadian at NAIT.
 Pierre Lueders (Unknown), Canadian Olympic Athlete, and bobsleigh World Cup Champion, and Head Coach
 David Dorward (Unknown), Politician, Edmonton-Gold Bar MLA and Business Owner
 George Rogers (Business Administration with Accounting '80), Politician, Leduc-Beaumont MLA, City Mayor, Businessman
 Bob Peterson (Photography '65), Photographer
 Holger Petersen (Unknown), Businessman, Music Records Producer and Radio Broadcaster

See also
 Education in Alberta
 List of universities and colleges in Alberta
 Canadian Colleges Athletic Association
 Canadian Interuniversity Sport
 Canadian government scientific research organizations
 Canadian university scientific research organizations
 Canadian industrial research and development organizations

References

External links
 

 
Universities and colleges in Edmonton
Colleges in Alberta
Vocational education in Canada
Educational institutions established in 1962
1962 establishments in Alberta